Robert Edward Lavin (August 31, 1900 – November 1, 1972) was a college football and basketball player for the Kentucky Wildcats. On the football team, Lavin was a quarterback for coach Bill Juneau's Wildcats. In the 55–0 loss to Centre in 1921, Lavin was his team's lone star. The 1921 team scored on Vanderbilt for the first time. He was a guard on the basketball team, playing with Basil Hayden. The 1921 basketball team won a Southern Intercollegiate Athletic Association (SIAA) championship.

References

American football quarterbacks
Kentucky Wildcats football players
Kentucky Wildcats men's basketball players
Guards (basketball)
1900 births
1972 deaths
Players of American football from Kentucky
People from Paris, Kentucky
Basketball players from Kentucky
American men's basketball players